Elen Rhys (born September 2, 1983) is a Welsh actress, known for her roles as Gwen in the 2011 film Panic Button and Miranda Blake in the BBC drama The Mallorca Files.

Filmography

References

External links
 

Living people
Welsh film actresses
Welsh television actresses
People from Aberystwyth
1983 births